Gigantione is a genus of isopod crustaceans, in the family Bopyridae. Members of this genus are parasitic to other crustaceans like Eiconaxius, Atergatis floridus, Carpilius convexus, and other species.

Species 

 Gigantione bouvieri Bonnier, 1900
 Gigantione elconaxii Markham, 1994
 Gigantione giardi Nobili, 1906
 Gigantione hainanensis An, H. Yu & Markham, 2009
 Gigantione hawaiiensis Danforth, 1967
 Gigantione ishigakiensis Shiino, 1941
 Gigantione moebii Kossmann, 1881
 Gigantione mortenseni Adkison, 1984
 Gigantione notonyxae An, Williams & Jiang, 2016
 Gigantione petalomerae Markham, 1999
 Gigantione pikei Page, 1985
 Gigantione pratti Danforth, 1967
 Gigantione rathbunae Stebbing, 1910
 Gigantione rhombos An, H. Yu & Markham, 2009
 Gigantione sagamiensis Shiino, 1958
 Gigantione tau An, H. Yu & Markham, 2009
 Gigantione tuberculata An, Williams & Jiang, 2016
 Gigantione uberlackerae Adkison, 1984

References 

Isopod genera
Cymothoida